WFMK (99.1 FM) is an adult contemporary radio station licensed to East Lansing, Michigan and serving the Lansing radio market.  The station is owned by Townsquare Media and broadcasts in HD radio.

WFMK is one of the United States' oldest adult contemporary stations, having programmed the format for almost four decades.  The station signed on in 1959 as WSWM, and offered a MOR format.

WSWM was purchased by Robert G. Liggett Jr. owner of Liggett Communications in 1971.  Liggett changed the station's call sign to WFMK, and initially programmed a mix of Adult Contemporary music as "Stereo Island, WFMK 99" during the day (using the Stereo Island approach pioneered at WKNR-FM in Detroit), and Album Oriented Rock overnight.  The AOR portion of the format was dropped in the mid-1970s, and the Adult Contemporary format expanded to 24 hours a day, under the moniker Easy Rockin' FM 99.

Over the years WFMK's adult contemporary format has evolved to the point that the station's current slogan is "A Variety From the '80s to Now." WFMK has long been one of the most popular and most highly rated stations in the Lansing area.

When WHZZ in Lansing, Michigan abruptly changed format from Contemporary Hit Radio to Adult Hits in 2005, WFMK, along with WQHH and WJXQ temporarily took advantage of the format switch, touting the many CHR artists on the station until WFMK's sister station, WJIM-FM changed format from oldies to CHR a few days later.

In 2010, WFMK shifted to an all-Christmas Music format for the holiday season.  It was the first time the station had ever gone all-Christmas around the clock. This move was most likely due to crosstown WLMI going all-Christmas as well, just a few weeks before.  After going all-Christmas in 2012, WFMK replaced its long-running Saturday Night Retro Show with Backtrax USA, which is syndicated by Cumulus Media Networks and features hits of the 1980s and 1990s.

WFMK has had its jingle melody changed over the years.  During the mid and late 1980s, WFMK's jingles were by JAM Creative Productions and used the WENS melody.  In the 1990s, WFMK's jingles, by TM Century, also used the WENS melody, which also was the call sign melody for WMXV.  WFMK's jingle melody was changed again when the station began using the "Cuddle" jingle package from Thompson Creative; this package remained for seven years.  The most recent jingle melody change came in 2007 when WFMK began using Reelworld's 2007 WLIT jingle package; WFMK has stayed with Reelworld and the WLIT melody ever since. Their current jingle package to this day is Reelworld One AC and the KVIL package, both using the same WLIT melody.

On August 30, 2013, a deal was announced in which Townsquare Media would acquire 53 Cumulus Media stations, including WFMK, for $238 million. The deal is part of Cumulus' acquisition of Dial Global; Townsquare and Dial Global are both controlled by Oaktree Capital Management. The sale to Townsquare was completed on November 14, 2013.

Sources 

Michiguide.com - WFMK History

External links

Mainstream adult contemporary radio stations in the United States
FMK
Townsquare Media radio stations
Radio stations established in 1959
1959 establishments in Michigan